The Capital Curling Classic, known as the Moosehead Classic for sponsorship reasons (formerly the Mac Ice Classic) is an annual bonspiel on the men's and women's Ontario Curling Tour. It is held annually in at the beginning of October at the RCMP Curling Club in Ottawa, Ontario. 

It became an exclusively open event in 2018 (open to both genders).

Past Champions

Past Women's Champions

Past Open Champions

External links
Official site

References

Ontario Curling Tour events
Curling in Ottawa